Rodrigo Bentancur Colman (born 25 June 1997) is an Uruguayan professional footballer who plays as a midfielder for  club Tottenham Hotspur and the Uruguay national team.

He started his career in the youth system of Argentine side Boca Juniors in 2009. He was promoted to the senior squad in 2015, and won two Primera División titles and a Copa Argentina with the team. He was signed by Italian club Juventus in 2017, where he won three consecutive Serie A titles, among other trophies. In January 2022, Bentancur joined Tottenham Hotspur in the Premier League.

At international level, Bentancur was a member of the Uruguay U20 squad that won the 2017 South American U-20 Championship. He made his senior debut for Uruguay in 2017, representing the side at the FIFA World Cup in 2018 and 2022 and the Copa América in 2019 and 2021.

Club career

Boca Juniors
Bentancur is a product of the Boca Juniors youth academy. On 12 April 2015, he made his first team debut for the club in a league game against Nueva Chicago. He replaced Pablo Pérez after 77 minutes in a 0–0 home draw. His stint at Boca is mainly remembered  for his significant mistake against San Lorenzo, when he passed the ball to a rival forward (Mauro Matos) who then easily scored a last-minute victory goal that put his team at the top of the league, above Boca (in spite of this, they ended up winning the 2015 Argentine Primera División). He would make a similar mistake some years later, this time playing for Juventus, with a back-pass blunder inside his own penalty area which put his team one nil down in the first seconds of the game, in the 2020–21 UEFA Champions League Round of 16 (they ended up being eliminated due to the away goals rule).

On 13 July 2015, Bentancur, Guido Vadalá, Franco Cristaldo and Adrián Cubas became part of Carlos Tevez's deal, which saw Juventus have the first option to sign the youngsters until 20 April 2017, with Vadalá also joining Juventus on loan for the 2015–2017 seasons. Bentancur was tagged for €9.4 million. Juventus's CEO Giuseppe Marotta later confirmed that Juventus would be exercising their option to sign Bentancur in 2017. He arrived in Turin on 3 April 2017 and completed his medical on the same day. On 21 April 2017 Juventus completed their acquisition of Bentancur, signing him on a five-year deal effective from 1 July 2017 until 30 June 2022 for a €9.5 million transfer fee, plus additional performance based bonuses. Boca Juniors are also entitled to 50% of any future transfer fee that Juventus receive for Bentancur. Bentancur subsequently returned to Argentina to play out the remainder of the 2016–17 season with Boca Juniors.

Juventus

Bentancur formally became a player of Juventus on 1 July 2017, after the club activated the option to sign him in April 2017, in a deal which would keep him at the club until 2022. The first option to sign Bentancur was bought as part of Carlos Tevez's deal in July 2015. He made his club debut on 26 August 2017, coming on as a substitute in a 4–2 away win over Genoa in Serie A.

On 6 October 2018, Bentancur scored his first goal for the club in a 2–0 away win over Udinese in Serie A.

Tottenham Hotspur
On 31 January 2022, Bentancur joined Premier League club Tottenham Hotspur for an undisclosed fee. Bentancur made his debut for Spurs on 5 February in the FA Cup match against Brighton & Hove Albion, coming on a substitute in match that finished in a 3–1 win. He made his Premier League debut nine days later, coming on as a substitute for Pierre-Emile Højbjerg in a 2–3 loss against Southampton. 

On 18 September 2022, Bentancur scored his first goal for the club in a Premier League game against Leicester City, the third goal in a 6–2 victory at the Tottenham Hotspur Stadium. Later on in the season, Bentancur scored his first UEFA Champions League goal in a group stage match - an equaliser against Sporting CP. The match ended 1–1. He continued his goal-scoring form in Spurs' league fixture three days later, coming off the bench to score an injury-time winner against AFC Bournemouth, completing a 3–2 comeback after they had gone 2–0 down. Two weeks later he registered his first brace in the Premier League, with two late goals against Leeds United to secure a 4–3 victory for Spurs.

On 11 February 2023, Bentancur suffered an injury to his cruciate ligament during a match against Leicester City, which would rule him out of the team for the rest of the season.

International career
Bentancur was a member of Uruguay national under-20 team, winning 2017 South American U-20 Championship. The squad also finished as the fourth in 2017 FIFA U-20 World Cup.

In September 2017, Bentancur received his first senior call-up to the Uruguay national team by manager Óscar Tabárez for the team's upcoming 2018 World Cup qualifiers against Venezuela and Bolivia in October. He made his international debut on 5 October, coming on as a substitute in Uruguay's 0–0 away draw against Venezuela. He was named in the squad for the China Cup in March 2018.

In May 2018, Bentancur was named in Uruguay's provisional 26-man squad for the 2018 FIFA World Cup in Russia. He was later included in the team's final 23-man squad for the tournament. He appeared in Uruguay's opening match of the tournament on 15 June, a 1–0 victory over Egypt at the Yekaterinburg Arena. In the Round of 16 match against Portugal on 30 June, he set-up Edinson Cavani's second goal in an eventual 2–1 victory. Uruguay were eliminated from the tournament following a 2–0 defeat to eventual champions France in the quarter-finals on 6 July.

In March 2019, Tabárez included Bentancur in the final 23-man Uruguay squad for the 2019 Copa América in Brazil. In the quarter-finals against Peru on 29 June, a 0–0 draw after regulation time saw the match go to a penalty shoot-out; although Bentancur was able to score his kick, Uruguay lost the shoot-out 4–5 and were eliminated from the competition.

Style of play
A dynamic, hard-working, skillful, elegant, and tactically versatile midfielder, who is comfortable using either foot, Bentancur has been described as a tall and "physically strong" player, who is capable of playing in any midfield position, including as a defensive midfielder, as a central midfielder, as a winger on either flank, in a box-to-box role, or even as a mezzala, or as an attacking midfielder behind the forwards, due to his ability to make attacking runs from behind.

He also possesses good close control, technique, and quick footwork, which enable him to get past opponents when in possession, while his vision, intelligence, personality, and incisive passing also allow him to set the tempo of his team's play in a more creative role as a regista deep in midfield, and create goalscoring opportunities for his teammates after winning back the ball. His height and strong frame also enable him to act as a "target man" in an advanced midfield role; he has even played as a second striker on occasion.

Although his acceleration is not particularly impressive, he is also a mobile player, who is capable of pressing opponents further up the pitch. Moreover, he has also drawn praise in the media for his composure and quick-thinking both with and without the ball. Due to his precociousness, talent, maturity, and wide range of skills, he is considered to be a highly promising young player in the media.

Career statistics

Club

International

Scores and results list Uruguay's goal tally first, score column indicates score after each Bentancur goal.

Honours
Boca Juniors
 Primera División: 2015, 2016–17
 Copa Argentina: 2014–15

Juventus
 Serie A: 2017–18, 2018–19, 2019–20
 Coppa Italia: 2017–18, 2020–21
 Supercoppa Italiana: 2018, 2020

Uruguay U20
 South American Youth Football Championship: 2017

References

External links

 Profile at the Tottenham Hotspur F.C. website
 
 

1997 births
Living people
People from Nueva Helvecia
Uruguayan people of French descent
Uruguayan footballers
Association football midfielders
Uruguay international footballers
Uruguay under-20 international footballers
2018 FIFA World Cup players
2019 Copa América players
2021 Copa América players
2022 FIFA World Cup players
Boca Juniors footballers
Juventus F.C. players
Tottenham Hotspur F.C. players
Argentine Primera División players
Serie A players

Uruguayan expatriate footballers
Uruguayan expatriate sportspeople in Argentina
Expatriate footballers in Argentina
Uruguayan expatriate sportspeople in Italy
Expatriate footballers in Italy
Uruguayan expatriate sportspeople in England
Expatriate footballers in England
Premier League players